Just Us is the eleventh studio album by American country music band Alabama, released in 1987. As with most of their albums, the band co-produced with Harold Shedd. The album charted at number 1 on Billboard Top Country Albums, and accounted for three singles. It also charted at number 55 on the Billboard 200.

Content
The album's three singles all charted on Hot Country Songs: "Tar Top" made number 7, followed by the number 1 singles "Face to Face", which featured K. T. Oslin on guest vocals, and "Fallin' Again". Lead singer Randy Owen wrote or co-wrote all three singles.

Critical reception

Track listing

Personnel 
From Just Us liner notes.

Alabama
 Randy Owen – lead vocals, electric guitar
 Jeff Cook – electric guitar, backing vocals, lead vocals (8)
 Teddy Gentry – bass guitar, backing vocals, lead vocals (7)
 Mark Herndon – drums

Additional musicians
 David Briggs – keyboards
 Costo Davis – synthesizers
 Mark Casstevens – acoustic guitar
 Steve Gibson – electric guitar
 Josh Leo – electric guitar
 Brent Rowan – electric guitar
 John Willis – electric guitar
 Mark O'Connor – mandolin
 Larry Paxton – bass guitar
 Eddie Bayers – drums
 James Stroud – drums
 Farrell Morris – percussion
 Charlie McCoy – harmonica
 Blaine Sprouse – fiddle
 Jim Horn – saxophones
 Mike Haynes – piccolo trumpet
 Bobby G. Taylor – English horn
 Sheldon "Butch" Curry – string arrangements
 The "A Strings" – strings
 Bobby Jones and New Life – backing vocals (3)
 K.T. Oslin – backing vocals (5)

Technical
 Alabama – producers
 Harold Shedd – producer
 Jim Cotton – engineer
 Joe Scaife – engineer
 Paul Goldberg – assistant engineer
 Milan Bogdan – digital editing
 Benny Quinn – mastering at Masterfonics (Nashville, Tennessee)
 Chuck Khun – photography 
 Bill Brunt – art direction, design 
 Mary Hamilton – art direction

Chart performance

Weekly charts

Year-end charts

Certifications

References

1987 albums
RCA Records albums
Alabama (American band) albums
Albums produced by Harold Shedd